The 2013 WK League was the fifth season of the WK League, the top division of women's football in South Korea. The regular season began on 18 March 2013 and ended on 7 October 2013. Goyang Daekyo were the defending champions.

Teams

Table

Results

Matches 1 to 14

Matches 15 to 28

Play-offs
The playoff is played one leg and championship final is played over two legs.

Semi-final

Championship final
1st leg

2nd leg

Incheon Hyundai Steel Red Angelswon 4–2 on aggregate.

References

External links
WK League official website
2013 WK League on RSSSF
2013 WK League on Soccerway

2013
Women